Tumalo is an unincorporated community and census-designated place (CDP) in Deschutes County, Oregon, United States. As of the 2010 census it had a population of 488. In the Klamath language, tumolo means "wild plum," a plentiful shrub in south central Oregon. Tumola means "ground fog," which may have described Tumalo Creek. Tumallowa, the original name of Tumalo Creek, means "icy water."

Geography
Tumalo is in north-central Deschutes County on U.S. Route 20 between Sisters,  to the northwest, and Bend, the county seat  to the south.

The town lies along the Deschutes River.

Demographics

History
The town was originally called "Laidlaw", after W. A. Laidlaw, the town promoter. The Tumalo Irrigation Project and Tumalo post office had been established in 1904. Although the project ended and the Tumalo post office closed in 1913, by 1915 residents of Laidlaw changed the town name to "Tumalo".

Due to population growth in the Bend area a new zip code was added effective July 1, 2015.  The new zip code, 97703, changed the zip code of Tumalo from 97701 to 97703.

Notable residents
Ben Westlund, politician

See also
Tumalo Mountain   
Tumalo State Park

References

Unincorporated communities in Deschutes County, Oregon
Census-designated places in Oregon
Census-designated places in Deschutes County, Oregon
1904 establishments in Oregon
Populated places established in 1904
Unincorporated communities in Oregon
Oregon placenames of Native American origin